Gastel is a village in the Dutch province of North Brabant. It is located in the municipality of Cranendonck.  In 2020, the village had 744 inhabitants.

History 
The village was first mentioned in 1307 as Gherardus de Gastele, and means guesthouse/inn.

Gastel was home to 79 people in 1840.
Gastel was a separate municipality until 1821, when it became a part of Soerendonk, Sterksel en Gastel.

References

Populated places in North Brabant
Former municipalities of North Brabant
Cranendonck